Ormiston railway station is located on the Cleveland line in Queensland, Australia. It serves the suburb of Ormiston in the City of Redland.

History
In 1889, the Cleveland line was extended from Manly to the original Cleveland station.

Ormiston station opened in 1889 at the same time as the line. On 1 November 1960, the station closed when the line was truncated to Lota. The station reopened on 24 October 1987 at the same time as the rebuilt line from Wellington Point to Cleveland.

Services
Ormiston is served by Cleveland line services from Shorncliffe, Northgate, Doomben and Bowen Hills to Cleveland.

Services by platform

References

External links

Ormiston station Queensland Rail
Ormiston station Queensland's Railways on the Internet
[ Ormiston station] TransLink travel information

Railway stations in Redland City
Railway stations in Australia opened in 1889